Edison Everton Wedderburn (born 6 December 1960) is a male English former distance runner who competed mainly in the 3000 metres steeplechase. He represented Great Britain at the 1988 Olympic Games and won a silver medal at the 1985 Universiade.

Career
Wedderburn finished second in the 3000m steeplechase at the 1982 UK Athletics Championships behind Roger Hackney, and second at the 1983 AAAs Championships behind Colin Reitz. In 1985, he won a silver medal at the World Student Games (Universiade) behind Italy's Franco Boffi. A two-time winner of the AAAs Championship steeplechase title, he won in 1986 (8:34.03) and in 1987 (8:24.78). Wedderburn competed at the 1987 World Championships in Rome, where the top four in each heat were assured of qualifying for the final. He was fifth in heat one, running 8:24.09 (19th overall).

Wedderburn achieved his lifetime best in the 3000m steeplechase on 5 July 1988 at the DN Galan in Stockholm, running 8:18.32. As of 2016, this time ranks him fifth on the British all-time list behind Mark Rowland, Colin Reitz, Tom Hanlon and Graeme Fell. In September 1988, after qualifying from his heat with 8:38.90, he ran 8:28.62 to finish 10th in his semifinal at the Seoul Olympics (18th overall).

He represented England, at the 1986 Commonwealth Games in Edinburgh, Scotland and represented England, at the 1990 Commonwealth Games in Auckland, New Zealand.

National titles
1986 AAAs Championships 3000m Steeplechase  
1987 AAAs Championship 3000m Steeplechase - 2nd (1983 & 1989) 3rd (1988). 
Also 2nd at UK Athletics Championships 3000m Steeplechase (1982) and 3rd at AAAs Indoor Championship 3000m (1989)

International competitions

References

Eddie also worked in Oldswinford CoE primary school

1960 births
Living people
English male steeplechase runners
British male steeplechase runners
Olympic athletes of Great Britain
Athletes (track and field) at the 1988 Summer Olympics
Universiade medalists in athletics (track and field)
Universiade silver medalists for Great Britain
Athletes (track and field) at the 1986 Commonwealth Games
Athletes (track and field) at the 1990 Commonwealth Games
Commonwealth Games competitors for England